The Adventures of Ferdinand, Count Fathom is a novel by Tobias Smollett first published in 1753.  It was Smollett's third novel and met with less success than his two previous more picaresque tales.  The central character is a villainous dandy who cheats, swindles and philanders his way across Europe and England with little concern for the law or the welfare of others. He is the son of an equally disreputable mother, and Smollett himself comments that "Fathom justifies the proverb, 'What's bred in the bone will never come out of the flesh".  Sir Walter Scott commented that the novel paints a "complete picture of human depravity" 

The main character reappears as a minor character in Smollet's later novel The Expedition of Humphry Clinker.

The novel's elements of terror and the supernatural have caused some historians of English literature to describe it as anticipating the themes of the Gothic novel.

Bibliography

 Title: The Adventures Of Ferdinand Count Fathom
 Author: Tobias George Smollett
 Illustration: Thomas Stothard
 Edition: reprinted
 Editor: Kessinger Publishing, 2004
 , 9781417939909
 464 pages

References

External links

 

1753 novels
Novels by Tobias Smollett
British horror novels
18th-century British novels